Mount Lamarck is a  mountain summit located on the crest of the Sierra Nevada mountain range in northern California, United States. It is situated on the shared boundary of Kings Canyon National Park with John Muir Wilderness, and along the common border of Fresno County with Inyo County. 
Subsidiary peak Mount Lamarck North ( ranks as the 67th highest summit in California, and the sixth highest in the Evolution Region.

History
In 1895, Sierra Club explorer Theodore S. Solomons named a group of mountains in the Sierra Nevada after exponents of Darwin's theory of evolution. These six peaks are now known collectively as the Evolution Group. The peaks were named after Charles Darwin, John Fiske, Alfred Russel Wallace, Herbert Spencer, Ernst Haeckel and Thomas Henry Huxley.

This mountain's name was officially adopted in 1911 by the United States Board on Geographic Names, based on a suggestion by Grove Karl Gilbert, to honor French naturalist Jean-Baptiste Lamarck (1744–1829), an early proponent of the idea that biological evolution occurred in accordance with natural laws.

The first ascent of the summit was made via the south slope on August 15, 1925, by Norman Clyde, who is credited with 130 first ascents, most of which were in the Sierra Nevada.

Climate
According to the Köppen climate classification system, Mount Lamarck is located in an alpine climate zone. Most weather fronts originate in the Pacific Ocean, and travel east toward the Sierra Nevada mountains. As fronts approach, they are forced upward by the peaks, causing them to drop their moisture in the form of rain or snowfall onto the range (orographic lift). The climate supports a small glacier in the cirque below Lamarck's steep northern cliffs. Precipitation runoff from this mountain drains northeast into Lamarck Creek which is a tributary to Bishop Creek, and west into Evolution Creek, which is a San Joaquin River tributary.

See also

 List of the major 4000-meter summits of California

References

External links

 Weather forecast: Mount Lamarck
 Mt. Lamarck climbing: Mountainproject.com

Inyo National Forest
Mountains of Inyo County, California
Mountains of Fresno County, California
Mountains of Kings Canyon National Park
Mountains of the John Muir Wilderness
North American 4000 m summits
Mountains of Northern California
Sierra Nevada (United States)